Sam Hughes (1 September 1823 – 1 April 1898) was the last great ophicleide player and one of the greatest who ever played the instrument in its short history.

Biography
Samuel Hughes was born in Trentham, Staffordshire, England, the son of a bricklayer.

In the mid-19th century the ophicleide was the bass-baritone instrument of the brass family, replacing the serpent and in turn being replaced by the euphonium. It was a keyed instrument (unlike the serpent), but without valves (unlike the euphonium).

Hughes began his career playing the ophicleide in one of the newly popular brass bands, the Cyfarthfa Brass Band in Merthyr Tydfil, Wales. He played with the band from the mid-1850s to about 1860. In 1860 the band won the national contest at The Crystal Palace, but Hughes was no longer with them. He also played with Louis Antoine Jullien's orchestra. There he became a star, known especially for his ophicleide solo of "Ruddier Than the Cherry" from Acis and Galatea. Even George Bernard Shaw, who had written disparagingly of the instrument (it had been "born obsolete") was impressed with this song when he heard it at Covent Garden.

Hughes became professor of ophicleide at the Royal Military School of Music at Kneller Hall and at the Guildhall School of Music.

He died in poverty in 1898 in Reading, Berkshire, England. The ophicleide died with him. His widow received a small grant for his burial from the Royal Society of Musicians. His instrument is on display in the Cyfarthfa Castle Museum, known around the world as one of the best surviving examples of its type.

References 
"A Lament for Sam Hughes", by Trevor Herbert

External links
"The History and Development of the Euphonium", by David Childs

1824 births
1898 deaths
British performers of early music
Musicians from Staffordshire
People from Trentham, Staffordshire